Sir William Compton (c. 1482 – 30 June 1528) was a soldier and one of the most prominent courtiers during the reign of Henry VIII of England.

Family and early life
Compton was born around 1482, the only son and heir of Edmund Compton of Warwickshire and Joan, the daughter of Walter Aylworth. He was around eleven years of age when his father died in 1493, at which time he became a ward of Henry VII, who appointed him page to Prince Henry, Duke of York. He was about nine years older than Henry, but the two became close friends.

Marriage and issue
He married firstly, in May 1512, Werburga, the daughter of Sir John Brereton and Katherine Berkeley, and widow of Sir Francis Cheyney. They had a son and at least two daughters:
 Peter Compton (1523 – 1544), the eldest son and heir, aged six at his father's death, became the ward of cardinal Thomas Wolsey. He married Anne, daughter of George Talbot, 4th Earl of Shrewsbury and by her, had a son, Henry who was created Baron Compton by Elizabeth I. Henry's son, William was made Earl of Northampton by James I.

He married secondly, after 8 May 1522,  Elizabeth Stonor, the daughter of Sir Walter Stonor and by her had at least one child.

Career
On Henry's accession in 1509, he was given the position of Groom of the Stool, the man who was in closest contact with the young king. The Groom waited on the king while he used the latrine or close stool, and was also in charge of linen and the King's clothes, jewels and tableware. One of his duties, according to the courtier Elizabeth Amadas, was to procure women for his monarch and arrange trysts with them at his London home, in Thames Street. Compton was also the steward, or administrator, of several royal manors.

Compton was knighted 25 September 1513 at Tournai, following the Battle of the Spurs. He had been able to muster 578 soldiers for the campaign in France from the manors he stewarded, almost as many as all the other members of the Privy chamber raised in total. In 1521 he was present at Henry VIII's meeting with Francis I at the Field of the Cloth of Gold and at Gravelines for the king's interview with Charles V. Compton served on the Scottish borders under the Earl of Surrey in 1523, and this appears to have been the only time he was far from the court. It was thought that his rival Thomas Wolsey contrived his being sent there, hoping to diminish his influence over the king.

Although he was not a politician, Compton ultimately acquired significant influence over Henry when it came to granting land and favours to the aristocracy, and made a fortune himself. The offices he held included:
 Groom of the Bedchamber
 Chief Gentleman of the Bedchamber
 Chief Ranger of Windsor Great Park
 Groom of the Stool
 Constable of Gloucester Castle
 Constable of Sudeley Castle
 Constable of Warwick Castle
 Chancellor of Ireland, 1513–1516
 Usher of the Black Rod,  4 February 1513
 Sheriff of Hampshire, 1512–1513
 Sheriff of Somersetshire and Dorsetshire, 1513–1514
 High Sheriff of Worcestershire, 1516 to 1528
 Under-treasurer of the Exchequer, 1525

Anne Stafford
In 1510, Compton was involved in a public row with Edward Stafford, 3rd Duke of Buckingham over Henry's affair with the Duke's married sister, Lady Anne Hastings. Around 1519, Compton became involved with Anne himself. In 1521, Henry sent Compton to arrest Anne's brother, the Duke of Buckingham, who was later executed for treason.

Death
In his will, which was dated 8 March 1523, Compton made provisions for Lady Hastings, his first wife, Werburga and his children. His will was made while his first wife was still living and not updated to provide for his second wife, Elizabeth, who was expecting a child at the time of his death. He died 30 June 1528 of the sweating sickness which killed several courtiers including Anne Boleyn's brother-in-law, William Carey. He was buried in the chapel at Compton Wynyates. 

His widow, Elizabeth, was still attempting to claim her jointure at the time of her second marriage to Walter Walshe, a page of the Privy chamber in November 1529, and the matter had not been resolved by June 1538, when her father wrote to Thomas Cromwell on his daughter's behalf: "We both desire your Lordship's favour in her causes, else she is like to be wronged".

Fictional portrayals
A fictionalized William Compton was portrayed by Kris Holden-Ried in 2007 on the Showtime television series The Tudors, loosely based upon the reign of Henry VIII. He was portrayed by Luke Mullins in 2019 on the Starz television series The Spanish Princess, loosely based upon the life of Catherine of Aragon.

Notes

References

External links

 All the King's Men: Sir William Compton - Part I A biography
 All the King's Men: Sir William Compton - Part II
 Sir William Compton, Knt Sir William Compton's will in Testamenta Vetusta, volume II, pp. 591–594

1482 births
1528 deaths
People from Warwickshire
15th-century English people
Lord chancellors of Ireland
High Sheriffs of Hampshire
High Sheriffs of Somerset
High Sheriffs of Dorset
High Sheriffs of Worcestershire
Ushers of the Black Rod
English courtiers
English knights
Deaths from sweating sickness
Grooms of the Stool
Knights Bachelor
Court of Henry VIII